In mathematics, the Schwarz lemma, named after Hermann Amandus Schwarz, is a result in complex analysis about holomorphic functions from the open unit disk to itself. The lemma is less celebrated than deeper theorems, such as the Riemann mapping theorem, which it helps to prove. It is, however, one of the simplest results capturing the rigidity of holomorphic functions.

Statement

Proof
The proof is a straightforward application of the maximum modulus principle on the function

As  we get .

So by the maximum modulus principle,  is equal to a constant  such that . Therefore, as desired.

Schwarz–Pick theorem
A variant of the Schwarz lemma, known as the Schwarz–Pick theorem (after Georg Pick), characterizes the analytic automorphisms of the unit disc, i.e. bijective holomorphic mappings of the unit disc to itself:

Let  be holomorphic. Then, for all ,

and, for all ,

The expression

is the distance of the points ,  in the Poincaré metric, i.e. the metric in the Poincaré disc model for hyperbolic geometry in dimension two. The Schwarz–Pick theorem then essentially states that a holomorphic map of the unit disk into itself decreases the distance of points in the Poincaré metric. If equality holds throughout in one of the two inequalities above (which is equivalent to saying that the holomorphic map preserves the distance in the Poincaré metric), then  must be an analytic automorphism of the unit disc, given by a Möbius transformation mapping the unit disc to itself.

An analogous statement on the upper half-plane  can be made as follows:

Let  be holomorphic. Then, for all ,

This is an easy consequence of the Schwarz–Pick theorem mentioned above: One just needs to remember that the Cayley transform 
 maps the upper half-plane  conformally onto the unit disc . Then, the map  is a holomorphic map from  onto . Also, for all ,

If equality holds for either the one or the other expressions, then  must be a Möbius transformation with real coefficients. That is, if equality holds, then

Proof of Schwarz–Pick theorem
The proof of the Schwarz–Pick theorem follows from Schwarz's lemma and the fact that a Möbius transformation of the form

maps the unit circle to itself. Fix  and define the Möbius transformations

 

Thus we can apply Schwarz's lemma, which is to say

Now calling  (which will still be in the unit disk) yields the desired conclusion

Further generalizations and related results
The Schwarz–Ahlfors–Pick theorem provides an analogous theorem for hyperbolic manifolds.

The Koebe 1/4 theorem provides a related estimate in the case that  is univalent.

See also 

 Nevanlinna–Pick interpolation

References

 Jurgen Jost, Compact Riemann Surfaces (2002), Springer-Verlag, New York.  (See Section 2.3)

Riemann surfaces
Lemmas in analysis
Theorems in complex analysis
Articles containing proofs